During the 2000-01 season A.S. Roma competed in Serie A, Coppa Italia and UEFA Cup.

Summary
In 2001, Associazione Sportiva Roma took its third league title (after 1942 and 1983), winning Serie A only a year after local rivals Lazio. Important signings for the season were Argentines Walter Samuel, a defender, and Gabriel Batistuta, a top striker. Manager Fabio Capello's line-up also included Cafu, Vincent Candela, Emerson, Vincenzo Montella and captain Francesco Totti.

Capello won Serie A once again when on the last matchday Roma defeated Parma 3–1 at home with Totti, Montella and Batistuta scoring.

Players

Squad information

Reserve squad

Transfers

In

Total spending:  97,402,000€

Out

Total income:  3,360,000€

Competitions

Overall

Last updated: 17 June 2001

Serie A

League table

Results summary

Results by round

Matches

Coppa Italia

Round of 16

UEFA Cup

First round

Second round

Third round

Eightfinals

Statistics

Appearances and goals

Goalscorers

Last updated: 17 June 2001

Clean sheets

Last updated: 17 June 2001

Disciplinary record
Last updated:

References

A.S. Roma seasons
Roma
Italian football championship-winning seasons